Soldat Jahman also known as Jah-Man or Jahman, (born in 1979) is a French ragga hip hop artist originating from the Martinique combining also various influences like reggaeton and rap.

Based in Marseille, he was part of the Ghetto Boyz Club (G.B.C. aka B-O-G). Soldat Jahman also cooperates closely with DJ Mam's and is part of DJ Mam's music collectif 123 Marseille. He is famous for his singles "Boogie Dance", "My Sexy Lady" and "Bolide". In 2013, he released "Sexy Bam Bam" as a duo with Luis Guisao.

Soldat Jahman is featured on many of DJ Mam's tracks, most notably in the original version of "Zumba He Zumba Ha", but also in "Hella décalé", "Tonight" and the title track "Fiesta Buena" of DJ Mam's album of the same name. In 2012, he was also featured in Mika V. single "Danza en la Playa" alongside Luis Guisao.

Discography

Singles
2010: "Hella Décalé"
2011: "Zumba He Zumba Ha"
2011: "Boogie Dance"
2011: "Bolide" 
2012: "Fiesta Buena"
2013: "Sexy Bam Bam" (with Luis Guisao) 
2014: "Dale Feat. Kenza Farah"
2014: "Que Bonita"
Featured in singles

References

External links
Facebook
YouTube
Discogs

1979 births
Living people
French people of Martiniquais descent
21st-century French singers
21st-century French male singers